University Centre Shrewsbury is a Higher Education Institution in Shrewsbury, Shropshire.

Established by Shropshire Council and the University of Chester, University Centre Shrewsbury opened in autumn 2014. Postgraduate students started courses in autumn 2014 and undergraduate students began degree programmes from autumn 2015.

Courses
Postgraduate courses include the Master of Business Administration and the History of Science Master's. Undergraduate courses include BA Musical Theatre, BSc Biochemistry, BA English and BSc Sport Management.

Organisation and structure 
University Centre Shrewsbury is overseen by a Head of Centre. It is organised into subject area groups. Currently, these consist of:

 Arts and Humanities
 Business and Management
 Education
 Health and Social Care
 Science
 Social Sciences

Sites

Guildhall
Guildhall at Frankwell Quay is University Centre Shrewsbury’s teaching and learning centre. Constructed in 2004, the building includes open access computers, several lecture theatres and seminar rooms, library facilities and social spaces. Guildhall is also the headquarters for the University Centre’s four research and learning centres.

Rowley’s House
Rowley’s House, in the town centre, is a five-minute walk from the main teaching and learning space at Guildhall. Within the 16th Century building there are seminar spaces, postgraduate and general teaching spaces, and a University Centre helpdesk.

Mardol House
Newly redeveloped, student accommodation is offered at Mardol House, located in the town centre, close to Guildhall and Rowley’s House. The accommodation provides en-suite rooms, split into self-catered flats and studio apartments. The property has four studios adapted for students with disabilities and lift access to all floors. The property also provides secure access, 24/7 security, a Residential Warden on site, a laundrette and a bike store.

References

External links
University Centre Shrewsbury (official site)

Universities in England
Education in Shropshire
University of Chester
Educational institutions established in 2015
2015 establishments in England